The 2036 Summer Olympics, officially known as the Games of the XXXVI Olympiad, is a forthcoming international multi-sport event.

Bidding process
The new IOC bidding process was approved at the 134th IOC Session on 24 June 2019 in Lausanne, Switzerland. The key proposals, driven by the relevant recommendations from Olympic Agenda 2020, are:
Establish a permanent, ongoing dialogue to explore and create interest among cities/regions/countries and National Olympic Committees for any Olympic event
Create two Future Host Commissions (Summer and Winter Games) to oversee interest in future Olympic events and report to the IOC executive board
Give the IOC Session more influence by having non-executive board members form part of the Future Host Commissions.

The IOC also modified the Olympic Charter to increase its flexibility by removing the date of election from 7 years before the games and changing the host as a city from a single city/region/country to multiple cities, regions, or countries.

The change in the bidding process was criticised by members of the German bid as "incomprehensible" and hard to surpass "in terms of non-transparency".

Future host summer commissions
The full composition of the summer commissions, oversee interested hosts, or with potential hosts where the IOC may want to create interest, is as follows:

Dialogue stages
According to Future Host Commission terms of reference with rules of conduct, the new IOC bidding system is divided into 2 dialogue stages are:
Continuous Dialogue: Non-committal discussions between the IOC and Interested Parties (City/Region/Country/NOC interested in hosting) concerning hosting future Olympic events.
Targeted Dialogue: Targeted discussions with one or more Interested Parties (called Preferred Host(s)), as instructed by the IOC Executive Board.

Potential bids

Africa
   New Administrative Capital, Egypt
 Egypt has expressed interest in hosting the 2036 Summer Olympics in a multi-million dollar under-construction sports complex called the Egypt International Olympic City, 45 kilometers east of Cairo. In January 2022, Egyptian Sports Minister Ashraf Sobhy revealed the country's plans to bid for the games and potentially seek to become the first nation in Africa to host the Olympic Games. Cairo was previously bid at the 2008 Summer Olympics and was not shortlisted, before losing to Beijing, China. The project is stated to feature a 92,000-seat stadium, an Olympic-sized swimming pool, tennis courts and indoor venues.

Asia
  Seoul, South Korea
 Mayor of Seoul Oh Se-hoon said he is pursuing to host the 2036 Olympics quietly. He met with International Olympic Committee (IOC) President Thomas Bach at the IOC headquarters, Olympic House in Lausanne, Switzerland on October 24, 2022, and promoted Seoul's bid to host the Olympics. He also outlined the city's ongoing 2.1 trillion-won (US $1.46 billion) project to build a large-scale sports and entertainment complex (Jamsil Sports MICE Complex) in southeastern Seoul, saying the complex can be used as an instrumental facility for the 2036 Olympics. Bach responded that Seoul appears to be prepared to host an Olympics, referring to his recent visit to Seoul and briefings he received on the project.
  Chengdu-Chongqing, Nanjing, Shanghai, Guangzhou, Hangzhou, Wuhan, Xi'an, Shenzhen, Jinan, Dalian, Suzhou,  Zhengzhou and/or Xiamen, China
 Twelve cities in China have expressed interest in hosting the 2036 Summer Olympics, namely Shanghai, Nanjing (host city of the 2014 Summer Youth Olympics), Wuhan, Chengdu, Suzhou, Xi'an, Guangzhou (host city of the 2010 Asian Games), Shenzhen, Xiamen, Zhengzhou, Jinan and Dalian. Nanjing is the only one among the 12 interested cities that previously hosted the Olympic Games, hosting the Summer Youth Olympics in 2014. China launched the Chengdu-Chongqing joint bid proposal for the 2032 or the 2036 Summer Olympics. In March 2018, Pu Hu, a member of the CPPCC Chengdu Committee, submitted a proposal for Chengdu to bid for the 2036 Olympic Games.

 Ahmedabad, India
 India had previously expressed interest in hosting the 2032 Summer Olympics but is now focusing on hosting the 2036 Summer Olympics. The Ahmedabad Urban Development Authority (AUDA) hired PwC as its consultant which gave a final report on which venues and general infrastructure have to be built in order for the Olympics to be held in Ahmedabad. A large sports complex named the Sardar Vallabhbhai Patel Sports Enclave is also being built in Ahmedabad which will include venues for all sports. The cost of the sports complex will be  and could host the Olympics in 2036. In February 2021, India's home minister Amit Shah stated that the Sardar Patel sports complex will be developed in such a way that it can host Olympic Games and other international games in the future. In October of 2021, Indian Olympic Association president Narinder Batra stated that the Narendra Modi Stadium in Ahmedabad would be the venue for the opening ceremony of the games. He also confirmed that the IOA was in talks with the International Olympic Committee for a possible bid from India to host the 2036 Games. During 2022 Gujarat Legislative Assembly election campaign ruling Bhartiya Janata Party in state has manifested to host Olympics in Gujarat (particularly in Sardar Vallabhbhai Patel Sports Enclave, Ahmedabad). Indian Youth and Sports Affairs Minister Anurag Thakur said that India is willing to host 2036 Summer Olympics and also road will be presented at 140th IOC Session, Mumbai. He backed Ahmedabad to be the Host City.

 Nusantara, Indonesia
 On 1 July 2021, the Committee chief of the Indonesian Olympic Committee announced that Indonesia will bid for 2036 Summer Olympics after they failed to secure the 2032 edition, in their efforts to being the first South East Asian country to host the Olympics. The Committee chief Raja Sapta Oktohari said, "We will not back down and will continue to fight for the 2036 Olympics," promising more solid preparation. Indonesia previously hosted the 2018 Asian Games and was also interested in hosting the 2032 Summer Olympics, before losing out to Brisbane, Australia. On 3 August 2022, President Joko Widodo plans to hold the 2036 Olympics in Nusantara, the new capital city of Indonesia. Widodo later reaffirmed his country's efforts in November of the same year.

  Doha, Qatar

 There are plans for Doha to host the 2036 Games, and there have been meetings with IOC President Thomas Bach. Doha bid for both the 2016 Summer Olympics and 2020 Summer Olympics, but was not shortlisted either time. The Games were awarded to Rio de Janeiro and Tokyo respectively. Qatar hosted the 2022 FIFA World Cup and will host the 2030 Asian Games.

Europe
 Florence–Bologna or Turin, Italy
 In July 2021 the mayors of Florence Dario Nardella and Bologna Virginio Merola and the governors of Tuscany Eugenio Giani and Emilia Romagna Stefano Bonaccini expressed interest to present a bid for the 2036 Summer Olympics. In July 2022, Turin City Council committed to the mayor supporting the application in front of the Piedmontese and Italian governments.

  Istanbul, Turkey
On 8 June 2020, the Vice-President of the Turkish Olympic Committee (TNOC) Hazan Arat said "Istanbul should be a candidate city for the 2032 Summer Olympic Games." The mayor of İstanbul, Ekrem İmamoğlu also stated "We put forward our will, and in the name of Istanbul and Turkish people, we want to hold the Olympics and Paralympic Games in Istanbul." Istanbul bid unsuccessfully for the 2000 Summer Olympics, 2008 Summer Olympics, and the 2020 Summer Olympics, which lost to Sydney, Beijing and Tokyo respectively.

 Berlin, Germany and Tel Aviv, Israel
 There is currently a discussion about a joint application of Germany's Berlin and Israel's Tel Aviv. 100 years after the 1936 Olympics in Berlin, LSB President Thomas Härtel explained that this proposal should make clear where Germany stands today. Reminiscent of the 2006 FIFA World Cup and its German motto, "Die Welt zu Gast bei Freunden (A time to make friends)", he envisioned the 2036 Olympics in Berlin.

 Copenhagen, Denmark
 The Copenhagen city council is considering a small budget mini-Olympics.

North America
  Toronto-Montreal, Canada: On 3 February 2021, the Journal de Montreal reported that the Canadian Olympic Committee was exploring the possibility of a joint Montreal-Toronto bid for either the 2032 or 2036 Summer Olympics. Potential venues include those used for the 1976 Summer Olympics in Montreal, and the 2015 Pan Am Games in Toronto, while Toronto lost its bid for the 2008 Summer Olympics to Beijing, China.
  Guadalajara–Mexico City–Tijuana–Monterrey, Mexico

Carlos Padilla, president of the Mexican Olympic Committee believes that Guadalajara is one of the four Mexican cities (next to Mexico City, Tijuana and Monterrey) that could attempt to host some Olympic games after 2026. In an interview with the  ESPN chain the director said that those four cities "have everything" to seek to be headquarters, but not immediately. Guadalajara hosted the 2011 Pan American Games and bid for the 2022 Gay Games, losing to Hong Kong. Marcelo Ebrard, the Mexican Secretary of Foreign Affairs, stated on social media that if a bid is authorised by President Andrés Manuel López Obrador, the country will seek to host the 2036 or 2040 Olympic Games. Mexico who last hosted the Summer Olympics was in 1968 in Mexico City. On October 26th, 2022 Foreign Affairs Secretary of Mexico, Marcelo Ebrard, alongside the President of the Mexican Olympic Committee, announced that Mexico would be officially bidding to host the games in 2036.

Cancelled or rejected bids
 Madrid, Spain 
 After multiple unsuccessful bids for the Summer Olympics, Spain had originally planned to bid for the 2036 Olympics, but later shifted its focus to restructure the bid criteria potentially for the 2040 Olympics or beyond. Spanish Olympic Committee President Alejandro Blanco stated "I have had several meetings with the Mayor of Madrid talking about this issue and Madrid, without a doubt, is a city that should try to host the Olympic Games, but it will not opt for the 2036 Games." To date, the only Olympic games celebrated in the country were the 1992 Summer Olympics, which were held in Barcelona. Madrid had previously bid for the 1972, 2012, 2016, and the 2020 games, but was unsuccessful each time. The latter games were awarded to Munich, London, Rio de Janeiro and Tokyo respectively.

 Odesa, Ukraine
 Businessman and politician Borys Kolesnikov helped oversee Ukraine's co-hosting of football's UEFA Euro 2012 after being appointed as Deputy Prime Minister in 2010 and is the leader of the Ukrainian home political party, created in early 2021. In September 2021 he was quoted as expecting the 2036 Summer Olympic games will create an impact to generate income and development for the city's local economy and tourism. Following the Russian invasion of Ukraine Odesa and its surrounding region have been the target of shelling and air strikes by Russian forces.

 London–Birmingham–Liverpool–Manchester, United Kingdom 
 In February 2019, the Mayor of London Sadiq Khan and UK Sport expressed their interest in bidding for either the 2032 or 2036 Olympics. The mayor remarked that 2032 'was not out of the question' but 2036 is more likely. It is, however, unclear which year a bid will be made. London hosted the Summer Olympics in 1908, 1948, and 2012. Birmingham made a failed bid for the 1992 Summer Olympics (which were awarded to Barcelona, Spain) and Manchester made two failed bids for the 1996 Summer Olympics and the 2000 Summer Olympics (which were awarded to Atlanta, Georgia, United States and Sydney, Australia respectively). In July 2022, Khan said he and his office were working on plans to bring the Olympics back to London for 2036 in what would be the '"greenest Games ever". In a January 2023 interview, the Mayor stated that "2032 and 2036 are a done deal" and announced that a bid would be explored for 2040.

References

External links
 gamesbids.com - future Summer Olympic bids

 
 

Summer Olympics 2036
Summer Olympics by year